Tschiertschen-Praden is a municipality in the Plessur Region in the Grisons, Switzerland. It was formed on 1 January 2009 through the merger of Praden and Tschiertschen.

Geography

Before 2017, the municipality was located in the Churwalden sub-district of the Plessur district on the mountain slopes above the left side of the Schanfigger valley.

Demographics

The combined historical population is given in the following table:

Weather
Tschiertschen has an average of 123.9 days of rain per year and on average receives  of precipitation. During this month there is precipitation for an average of 12.7 days. The month with the most days of precipitation is June, with an average of 13.1, but with only  of precipitation.

References

External links

 
Municipalities of Graubünden